Shen Jun (born 9 May 1977) is a Chinese former judoka who competed in the 2000 Summer Olympics.

References

1977 births
Living people
Olympic judoka of China
Judoka at the 2000 Summer Olympics
Asian Games medalists in judo
Judoka at the 1998 Asian Games
Judoka at the 2002 Asian Games
Chinese female judoka
Asian Games silver medalists for China
Medalists at the 1998 Asian Games
20th-century Chinese women
21st-century Chinese women